General elections were held in the Kingdom of Denmark on 18 June 2015 to elect the 179 members of the Folketing. 175 members were elected in the Denmark proper, two in the Faroe Islands and two in Greenland. Although the ruling Social Democrats became the largest party in the Folketing and increased their seat count, the opposition Venstre party was able to form a minority government headed by Lars Løkke Rasmussen with the support of the Danish People's Party, the Liberal Alliance and the Conservative People's Party.

Background
Following the 2011 general election, a minority government was formed by the Social Democrats, the Social Liberal Party and the Socialist People's Party. The government was supported by the Red–Green Alliance. Helle Thorning-Schmidt, the leader of the Social Democrats, became Prime Minister.

The government had rocky relations with the Red–Green Alliance, relying on their ad hoc support to pass bills instead of a formalized alliance. As a result, they occasionally preferred to cooperate with Venstre to pass legislation. Symbolically, Red–Green deputy Frank Aaen told Finance Minister Bjarne Corydon "Happy New Year" on 28 February 2013, because the government had failed to meet with his party since the beginning of 2013.

On 3 February 2014, the Socialist People's Party left the government in protest over the sale of shares in the public energy company DONG Energy to the investment bank Goldman Sachs. This sparked a crisis within the Socialist People's Party, as three former cabinet ministers left the party, joining either the Social Democrats or the Social Liberal Party. However, the Socialist People's Party continued to support the government on confidence motions, preventing an early election.

The incumbent government prior to the elections consisted of a coalition between the Social Democrats and Social Liberal Party, with Helle Thorning-Schmidt continuing as Prime Minister. The cabinet was composed of 14 Social Democratic ministers and 6 Social Liberal ministers.

Electoral system
The 179 members of the Folketing were elected in Denmark (175), the Faroe Islands (2) and Greenland (2). The 175 seats in Denmark included 135 seats elected in ten multi-member constituencies by proportional representation, using a modified version of the Sainte-Laguë method and Hare quota, and 40 "top-up" seats, allocated to parties in order to address any imbalance in the distribution of the constituency seats.

According to the Danish Constitution, the election had to be held no later than 14 September 2015, as the last election was held on 15 September 2011. The Prime Minister was able to call the election at any date, provided it was no later than four years from the previous election, and this is often cited as a tactical advantage to the sitting government, as it can call an early election when polls are favourable. On 27 May Thorning-Schmidt announced that the elections would be held on 18 June 2015.

Opinion polls

Polls notably underestimated the vote share received by the Danish People's Party.

Results

By constituency

Aftermath and government formation
Although the Social Democrats increased their share of the vote and won the most seats for the first time since 2001, the "Blue" opposition bloc led by Venstre's Rasmussen (Venstre, Danish People's Party, Liberal Alliance, Conservative People's Party, and Christian Democrats) gained a parliamentary majority over the "Red" Social Democrat-led bloc (Social Democrats, Red–Green Alliance, The Alternative, Social Liberals, and Socialist People's Party). Within an hour of the election result being declared, Thorning-Schmidt announced her government would step down on 19 June, and that she would also resign as party leader on the same day.

In accordance with the Danish Constitution, on the day after the election each party submitted their recommendation to Queen Margrethe II for the appointment of a party to be in charge of government formation negotiations (the role of the Queen was purely formal, as her appointment had to reflect the will of the majority of the elected MPs). The submitted recommendations showed a parliamentary majority (all "blue bloc" parties) for Venstre to lead the process of government formation. The negotiation mandate was unconditional from all "blue bloc" parties, except Liberal Alliance, who initially made their support conditional on a first negotiation phase being restricted to the attempt to assemble a majority government (including all elected "blue bloc" parties). After Rasmussen had been granted this specific mandate, he invited such negotiations to begin on 20 June.

Negotiations began on 20 June, but it was not thought likely that a majority government involving all the "blue bloc" parties was possible. The Conservative People's Party indicated they would rather stay out of a government coalition.

The Danish People's Party set out four conditions for their involvement in a coalition: a Eurosceptic approach to the EU, the re-introduction of border controls, further restrictions on immigration and asylum policy, and 0.8% growth in public spending. Meanwhile, the Liberal Alliance also indicated willingness to be in a coalition, but the party supports reductions in public spending, as does Venstre.

On 21 June, Rasmussen concluded that, having tried, it would not be possible to form a majority government and he announced his intention to seek a new negotiation mandate allowing a minority government. On 28 June, Lars Løkke Rasmussen's new government assumed office with a cabinet composed solely of Venstre ministers.

See also
List of members of the Folketing, 2015–2019

Notes

References

External links
Election polling and trends Politiken.dk
Greenland Folketing Election Results Qinersineq

Further reading 
 

Denmark
2015 elections in Denmark
2015 in the Faroe Islands
2015 in Greenland
2015
Elections in the Faroe Islands
Elections in Greenland
June 2015 events in Europe